Zoë Clare Keating (born February 2, 1972) is a Canadian-American cellist and composer once based in San Francisco, California, now based in Vermont.

Music career
Keating performed from 2002 to 2006 as second chair cellist in the cello rock band Rasputina. She is featured on Amanda Palmer's debut solo album, Who Killed Amanda Palmer.

In her solo performances and recordings Keating uses live electronic sampling and repetition in order to layer the sound of her cello, creating rhythmically dense musical structures. , her self-produced album One Cello x 16: Natoma reached #1 on the iTunes classical charts four times, and "Into the Trees" spent 47 weeks on the Billboard classical chart, peaking at #7. She is the recipient of a 2009 Performing Arts Award from Creative Capital.

Keating's songs have been featured in various commercials, TV shows, films, video games, and dance performances including CBS's Elementary, NBC's Crisis, So You Think You Can Dance, MTV's Teen Wolf, Dateline, Have You Heard from Johannesburg, The Day Carl Sandburg Died, Alice Walker: Beauty in Truth, The Retrieval, The Witness, and PBS's Searching: Our Quest for Meaning in the Age of Science.

In January 2011, Keating won the award for Contemporary Classical Album from The 10th Annual Independent Music Awards.

In July 2011, Keating was named a Young Global Leader of the World Economic Forum. She performed at the closing ceremony of the forum's Annual Meeting in Davos, Switzerland in January 2014 and 2016.

On September 1, 2013, the LA Times published an Op-Ed she authored.  It discussed the positive and negative effects of her iTunes revenue on her Do-It-Yourself performing career.

Keating composed the score to A&E's The Returned with Jeff Russo, and the pair composed music for season 2 of Manhattan, which aired in 2016 on WGN America.

Keating's song "Lost" is the theme music to the podcast On Being.

In 2020, Keating composed the score to The Edge of All We Know, a documentary about black holes. In 2021, during the height of the coronavirus pandemic, Keating co-composed, along with longtime collaborator Jeff Russo, the score to the HBO movie Oslo, a film adaptation of the Tony Award-winning play. On July 13, 2021, Keating and Russo's score for Oslo was nominated for a 2021 Emmy for Outstanding Music Composition For A Limited Or Anthology Series, Movie Or Special.

Personal life
In 1972, Keating was born in Guelph, Ontario, Canada to an English mother and an American father. She began playing the cello at the age of eight and attended Sarah Lawrence College in New York.  Prior to 2005, she worked as an information architect. She worked on projects at the now defunct Perspecta, Inc., and the Research Libraries Group (now part of OCLC) and the Database of Recorded American Music.

In March, 2010, Keating announced via her website that she was expecting her first child with her husband, Jeff Rusch, in May.

Rusch was diagnosed with stage 4 cancer in May, 2014, and was admitted to the hospital for emergency treatment. Days later, Keating and Rusch received a letter denying coverage for this hospital stay by their insurance company, Anthem. After local media publicized the story, Anthem Blue Cross reversed its decision, telling Keating in a phone call that the hospital stay would be covered. Rusch died on February 19, 2015.

Keating continues to advocate for patients, data portability and the simplification of medical insurance.

In October 2016 she was invited to participate in a panel discussion at the Frontiers Conference with President Barack Obama, Riccardo Sabatini and Kafui Dzirasa, moderated by Atul Guwande.

Discography

Solo
2004 - One Cello x 16 (EP)
2005 - One Cello x 16: Natoma
2010 - Into the Trees
2018 - Snowmelt (EP)

Soundtracks
2001 - I Am a Sex Addict - composer, additional music
2005 - Frozen Angels - composer, cello
2007 - The Devil's Chair - composer, cello
2008 - Ghost Bird - composer, cello
2008 - Not Forgotten - cello
2008 - The Secret Life of Bees - cello
2010 - Breaking Bad - recorded cello version of the theme by David Porter
2010 - (1)Doubt, (2)Nostalgia Trio, (3)Frozen Angels, (4)Coda, (5)Legions(War), (6)The Last Bird, (7)Arrival, (8)Legions(Aftermath) - for writing and performing in The House of Suh film credits
2010 - The Conspirator - cello
2011 - Warrior - cello
2012 - Elementary (TV series) - composer, cello
2015 - Felizes para Sempre? - composer of "Tetrishead", opening and ending theme
2015 - The Returned - composer, producer, cello, keyboards, vocals, guitar
2016 - Manhattan (TV series) - composer, cello
2016 - The Witness (2016 video game) - composer of "Escape Artist" used in the promotional video.
2017 - SMILF - composer, cello
2020 - The Edge of All We Know - composer, cello, piano
2021 - Oslo - composer, cello

Dance Works
 2008 - Llebeig with the Valencia Ballet - composer and performer, cello
 2014 - Boulders and Bones with ODC Dance - composer and performer, cello
 2021 - Swing Low with Joffrey Ballet - composer

With Mike Gordon and Leo Kottke 
2020 - Noon

With Curt Smith
 2010 - All is Love

With Pomplamoose
 2009 - Always in the Season

With Halou
 2008 - Halou

With Amanda Palmer
 2008 - Who Killed Amanda Palmer
 2010 - Amanda Palmer Performs the Popular Hits of Radiohead on Her Magical Ukulele
 2015 - Bigger on the Inside
 2018 - Big Yellow Taxi covered by Amanda Palmer, Zoe Keating, Sean Ono Lennon, John Cameron Mitchell

With Mar
2007 - The Sound

With Rasputina
2004 - Frustration Plantation
2005 - A Radical Recital

With John Vanderslice
2002 - Life and Death of an American Fourtracker

With Tarentel
2001 - The Order of Things

With Dionysos
1999 - Haiku

References

External links

 

An Exclusive interview with Zoe Keating at Bar Hop Sessions
Jad Abumrad interviews Zoe Keating on WNYC's Radiolab
"Zoe Keating unabridged" -(Wired interview)
Performing 2 pieces

1972 births
Ableton Live users
Canadian rock cellists
Living people
Musicians from Guelph
Rasputina (band) members
Sarah Lawrence College alumni